Daniel Lehner (born 14 April 1994) is an Austrian racing cyclist, who currently rides for UCI Continental team .

Major results
2018
 1st  Mountains classification Tour of Antalya

References

External links

1994 births
Living people
Austrian male cyclists
Place of birth missing (living people)
21st-century Austrian people